Sohland am Rotstein is a village and a former municipality in the district Görlitz, Saxony, Germany. Since 1 January 2014, it is part of the town Reichenbach.

References

Former municipalities in Saxony